The Evansville Vanderburgh School Corporation (EVSC) is a public school corporation serving Evansville, Indiana and Vanderburgh County; its boundary includes the entire county. It is the third largest school district in the state of Indiana, behind Indianapolis Public Schools and Fort Wayne Community Schools and the largest in Southern Indiana. The headquarters are located on Walnut Street in downtown Evansville. The school district serves nearly 23,000 students educated by more than 1,600 teachers.

The Evansville Vanderburgh School Corporation comprises 37 different schools – 17 elementary schools, 7 middle schools, 4 K-8 schools, 5 high schools and 4 magnet schools, one of which draws students from 8 other school corporations across 4 other counties.

On November 4, 2008 voters approved a $149 million bond issue for the Evansville Vanderburgh School Corporation, which paid for the new North High school and a list of other projects.

Elementary, K-8, and Middle Schools

Elementary schools
Caze Elementary K-5
Cynthia Heights Elementary K-5
Daniel Wertz Elementary PK-5
Delaware School K-6
Dexter Elementary K-5
Evans School PK-6
Fairlawn Elementary K-5
Harper Elementary K-5
Hebron Elementary K-5
Highland Elementary K-5
McCutchanville Elementary K-6
Oak Hill School K-6
Scott School PK-6
Stockwell Elementary K-5
Stringtown Elementary K-5
Tekoppel Elementary K-5
Vogel School K-6
West Terrace Elementary K-5

K-8
Cedar Hall Community School PK-8
Glenwood Leadership Academy
Lincoln School K-8
Lodge Community School

Middle schools
Helfrich Park STEM Academy
McGary Middle School
North Junior High School
Perry Heights Middle School
Thompkins Middle School
Washington Middle School

High schools

*The Southern Indiana Career & Technical Center draws students from eight school districts.

References

External links
 Evansville Vanderburgh School Corporation Official Website

School districts in Indiana
Southwestern Indiana
Education in Evansville, Indiana
Education in Vanderburgh County, Indiana